This list of McDonnell Douglas MD-11 operators lists both former and current operators of the aircraft, in transport of cargo and passengers.

References

Notes

MD-11
Operators